American Corner is a populated place in Caroline County, Maryland, United States. American Corner is home to Colonel Richardson High School and Colonel Richardson Middle School. On older maps, it is sometimes referred to as American Corners. There was formerly a post office, cannery, blacksmith, and a store located there, as seen on the 1875 and 1897 Maps of Caroline County, Maryland.

References

Unincorporated communities in Caroline County, Maryland
Unincorporated communities in Maryland